Bezděz is a municipality and village in Česká Lípa District in the Liberec Region of the Czech Republic. It has about 300 inhabitants. It is known for the Bezděz Castle.

Etymology
The name Bezděz is derived from the personal name Bezděd (Besdeth), meaning "Bezděd's (property)".

Geography

It lies mostly in the Ralsko Uplands, but the southeastern part of the municipal territory also extends into the Jizera Table. Most of the territory lies in the Kokořínsko – Máchův kraj Protected Landscape Area.

History
The first written mention of Bezděz is from 1264. In 1291 or 1293, the village was promoted to a town, but it lost its town privileges after Bělá pod Bezdězem was founded in 1304. In 1898, the village was severely damaged by fire.

Demographics

Economy
There are almost no job opportunities in the municipality, most residents commute to work in nearby towns.

Sights
Bezděz is known for the Bezděz Castle. The well-preserved ruin of a Gothic castle is one of the most important monuments of the whole region.

References

External links

Villages in Česká Lípa District